The 2021 Navy Midshipmen football team represented the United States Naval Academy as a member of the American Athletic Conference (AAC) in the 2021 NCAA Division I FBS football season. The Midshipmen were led by 14th-year head coach Ken Niumatalolo and played their home games at Navy–Marine Corps Memorial Stadium.

Previous season

The Midshipmen finished the 2020 season 3–7 overall and 3–4 in AAC play to place seventh in the conference.

Preseason

American Athletic Conference preseason media poll
The American Athletic Conference preseason media poll was released at the virtual media day held August 4, 2021. Cincinnati, who finished the 2020 season ranked No. 8 nationally, was tabbed as the preseason favorite in the 2021 preseason media poll.

Schedule

Personnel

Coaching staff

Source:

Roster

Rankings

Game summaries

Marshall

Air Force
 

Since this game was on the 20th anniversary of the 9/11 attacks, both teams donned special commemorative uniforms. The Air Force Falcons were designed to honor a B-52 bomber crew that flew in Operation Linebacker II during 1972. While the Midshipmen's uniform celebrated the United States Marine Corps, inspired by the iconic "Dress Blue A" uniform, with white gloves, black cleats, red trim, and royal blue pants. The helmet, shoulder and pant designs feature an Eagle, Globe and Anchor, as well as, the battle cry "OORAH", on the front of the helmet. The back of the helmet reads "Semper Fi", the Marine Corps motto abbreviated from Semper Fidelis, meaning "always faithful." The red stripe on the pants is known as the "Blood Stripe," a way to honor fallen and injured Marines.

at Houston

UCF

This was the Navy Midshipmen's first win since October 17, 2020 when they played at ECU. Navy snapped their losing streak and got their first win this season. Also during this game, the Naval Academy Athletic Association retired former All-American and College Football Hall of Fame safety Chet Moeller's number 48 jersey. Moeller, who was also the East Coast Athletic (ECAC) Player of the Year in 1975, played for the Midshipmen from 1972 to 1975. He is the first defensive player to have his number retired by the Midshipmen.

No. 24 SMU

at Memphis

No. 2 Cincinnati

at Tulsa

at No. 10 Notre Dame

East Carolina

at Temple

vs. Army

This year's Army-Navy Game uniforms for the Navy Midshipmen spotlight Naval Aviation, namely the carrier-based F/A-18 Super Hornet in a themed uniform named "Fly Navy". The color-rush navy kits feature the current active U.S. Military roundel national insignia, (a white star with white and red stripes), on each shoulder. On the left upper chest is a triangular squadron patch highlighting the Strike Fighter Wing, U.S. Atlantic Fleet based out of Naval Air Station in Oceana, Virginia.
The pants have a red stripe between two white stripes running down the side, while the gloves have the "Fly Navy" script on the palms.

The right side of the helmet is emblazoned with "the roundel" while left side of the helmet has a hand-painted F/A-18 Super Hornet ("the Rhino"), which are operated by naval aviators and also the jet flown by the Navy's elite flight demonstration squadron, the Blue Angels. On the back of the helmet, three sets of gold wings are featured which are earned by naval aviators: Single Anchor–Navy Aviators (pilots); Double Anchor–Naval Flight Officers (navigators); and AC–Aircrew.

This year's exclusive Game Ball by Team Issue features the silhouette of an F/A-18 Super Hornet, the U.S. Military Roundel and color scheme, as well as an intricate stitching design around the laces.

References

Navy
Navy Midshipmen football seasons
Navy Midshipmen football